Sagar v Ridehalgh & Sons Ltd [1931] 1 Ch 310 is a UK labour law case concerning the contract of employment. It concerns the implication of terms, regarding deductions from wages, through the custom of an industry.

Facts
Mr Sagar was a cotton weaver for Ridehalgh & Sons Ltd in Nelson, Lancashire. He claimed that pay had been wrongfully deducted from his wages allegedly for poor workmanship. His contract was oral, but pay was fixed by collective agreement with the Amalgamated Weavers' Association and the Cotton Spinners' and Manufacturers' Association. According to the collective agreement he should have been paid 2l. 5s. 0½d. But Ridehalgh Ltd only paid him 2l. 4s. 0½d., deducting 1s. in respect of a fault in 3 yards of the 80 yards piece. Mr Sagar had failed to piece up a broken thread of the warp. This made 3 yards of cloth unmerchantable. Mr Sagar said this was an unlawful deduction contrary to Truck Act 1831 section 3. But Ridehalgh Ltd argued mills in the locality had the custom of deducting for work that had been performed without reasonable care and skill in the management’s eyes. That had been so for thirty years at the workplace, though nobody had said anything in the oral agreement and no provisions concerning deductions were found in the collective agreement.

Farwell J said that Mr Sagar was entitled to be fully paid unless the employer used its right to terminate the contract.

Judgment
Lord Hanworth MR held the deduction was still lawful. It was a clear custom of the industry, not destroyed by the fact, once established, that many people dislike it, or contract out of it altogether.

Lawrence LJ and Romer LJ concurred.

See also

UK labour law
Employment contract in English law
Autoclenz Ltd v Belcher [2011] UKSC 41

Notes

References

United Kingdom labour case law
United Kingdom employment contract case law
1931 in British law
1931 in case law
Court of Appeal (England and Wales) cases